MIAT Mongolian Airlines is the national airline of Mongolia, headquartered in the MIAT Building in the country's capital of Ulaanbaatar. The airline operates international scheduled services from its base at Chinggis Khaan International Airport in Sergelen, near Ulaanbaatar.

History

Communist era 
MIAT Mongolian Airlines was established in 1956. It began operations with the help of Aeroflot and began flights on 7 July 1956 using an Antonov An-2 from Ulaanbaatar to Irkutsk. The airline also used Soviet-built Ilyushin Il-14s for flights to international destinations like Beijing and Moscow. During the 1960s and 1970s, the airline obtained Antonov An-24 and An-26 twin turboprops. A Tupolev Tu-154 jet on lease from Aeroflot was introduced in the late 1980s.

Post-communist era 
In 1992, MIAT bought five Chinese Harbin Y-12 commuter aircraft and acquired a Boeing 727-200 from Korean Air, one more following in 1994. An Airbus A310 was leased in 1998, and a new Boeing 737 was leased in 2002 to replace the aging 727-200 fleet. Between 2003 and 2008, MIAT's An-24 and An-26 fleet was gradually retired. In April 2008, MIAT received its second Boeing 737-800 aircraft on lease from CIT Aerospace.  In July 2008, MIAT ended scheduled domestic flights completely. In June 2009, the airline temporarily resumed scheduled domestic flights to Mörön and Khovd using its Boeing 737-800 aircraft.

In late 2009, MIAT flew charter flights to Hong Kong and Sanya, a popular resort city in Hainan, China.  In June 2010, the airline's flights were brought to a halt due to a mechanics' strike. However, the situation was resolved with the replacement of the CEO and Technical Director.

In early 2011, MIAT signed an agreement with Air Lease Corporation to lease two former China Eastern Boeing 767-300ERs until 2013.  The first aircraft entered service in May 2011 with the second following in November 2011. In 2011 the Airbus A310 was retired after serving MIAT Mongolian Airlines for 13 years.
In June 2011, MIAT began regular flights to Hong Kong. The company also ordered three aircraft, a Boeing 767-300ER and two Boeing 737-800s, to be delivered in 2013 and 2016 respectively. The order marks the first time in two decades that MIAT has chosen to expand its fleet by purchasing new aircraft straight from the manufacturer rather than leasing them.

In January 2019, MIAT announced flights to Shanghai and Guangzhou in China to start from summer of 2019. In addition, it announced the leasing of 3 Boeing 737 MAX aircraft to be delivered in January, May, and October 2019, thereby replacing two of its aircraft whose leases were due to expire in 2019, together with the implementation of a self-checkin system.

In December 2019, MIAT announced its first Boeing 787-9 aircraft are to be delivered in spring of 2022.

On the 21st of June 2020, MIAT flew for the first time in history to the United States. With a Boeing 767-300, they flew from Ulaanbaatar to Seattle, which is the first non-stop between Mongolia and the United States in history.

Destinations

Codeshare agreements 
MIAT Mongolian Airlines has codeshare agreements with the following airlines:
 Aeroflot
 Cathay Pacific
 Japan Airlines
 Korean Air
 Turkish Airlines

Fleet

Current fleet
As of May 2022, MIAT Mongolian Airlines operates an all-Boeing fleet consisting of the following aircraft:

Former fleet
MIAT has previously operated a variety of aircraft types, including:

 Airbus A310-300
 Airbus A330-300
 Antonov An-2
 Antonov An-24
 Antonov An-26
 Antonov An-30
 Boeing 727-200
 Boeing 737-500
 Boeing 737-700
 Harbin Y-12
 Ilyushin Il-14
 Kamov Ka-26
 Mil Mi-4
 Mil Mi-8
 Polikarpov Po-2
 Tupolev Tu-154
 Yakovlev Yak-12

Accidents and incidents
MIAT Mongolian Airlines has suffered the following incidents and accidents since commencing operations:

4 August 1963: Avia 14 Super MONGOL-105 crashed into the side of Otgontenger Mountain; there were no survivors.
17 September 1973: Antonov An-24B BNMAU-4206 crashed into the side of a mountain in Hovd Province of Mongolia during descent.
1 May 1979: Antonov An-24B BNMAU-1202 ran off the runway on landing at Erdenet Airport.
31 October 1981: PZL-Mielec An-2R MONGOL-613 crashed in Sukhbaatar Province.
25 June 1983: Antonov An-24RV BNMAU-8401 ran off the runway on landing at Buyant-Ukhaa International Airport, collapsing the right landing gear and rolling over; all 47 on board survived. The aircraft had suffered engine failure on final approach and had been losing altitude.
April 1985: Antonov An-24RV BNMAU-10207 reportedly crashed on approach to an airport in Khovsgol Province; the wreck was reportedly seen at Buyant-Ukhaa International Airport in 1995.
1985: Antonov An-24RV BNMAU-10210 force-landed in Khovsgol Province after both engines were shut down by mistake during a steep approach; the aircraft was written off.
23 January 1987: Antonov An-24RV BNMAU-7710 crashed on landing at Buyant-Ukhaa International Airport; there were no casualties.
26 January 1990: Antonov An-24RV BNMAU-10208 force-landed near Ulaangom Airport after the pilot failed to locate the airport at night; all 41 on board survived.
5 December 1992: Harbin Y-12 II D-0066 crashed on takeoff from Choibaisan Airport.
23 April 1993: Antonov An-26 BNMAU-14102 struck the side of Marz Mountain during descent into Ölgii Airport en route from Ulaanbaatar after the crew began descending too soon, killing all 32 on board; wreckage was found on 7 May 1993.
21 September 1995: Flight 557, an Antonov An-24RV (BNMAU-10103) struck a mountain near Choho Geologoh Uul during approach to Mörön Airport en route from Ulaanbaatar after the crew descended too soon; of the 43 on board, only a passenger survived. The accident remains the deadliest in Mongolia.
10 June 1997: Flight 447, a Harbin Y-12-II (JU-1020), lost control and crashed after encountering windshear while on final approach to Mandalgobi Airport, killing seven of 12 on board.
26 May 1998: Harbin Y-12 JU-1017 crashed into a mountain near Erdenet due to pilot error, killing all 28 passengers and crew on board.

See also
Transport in Mongolia

Notes

References

External links

Official website

Airlines of Mongolia
Airlines established in 1956
1956 establishments in Mongolia
Companies based in Ulaanbaatar